Pietro Camporese the Younger (1792–1873) was an Italian neoclassical architect.  

He was the grandson of the architect Pietro Camporese the Elder.

Architecture Works
 From 1825 Camporese worked with Pasquale Belli on the reconstruction of the Basilica of San Paolo fuori-le-mura, after it was damaged by fire. 

 He also was responsible for the Teatro Argentina in Rome.

 One of his major commissions was the Palazzo Wedekind in Rome.

References

1792 births
1873 deaths
19th-century Italian architects
Italian neoclassical architects